The 1992 Jordanian  League (known as The Jordanian  League,   was the 42nd season of Jordan  League since its inception in 1944. Al-Faisaly won its 24th league title by goal difference from Al-Hussein Irbid.

Teams

Map

League table 

No team relegated because the Football Association decided to increase the number of clubs to 12 teams in the 1993 season.

References

Jordanian Pro League seasons
Jordan
football
football